Thomas Garrett (28 February 1926 – 16 April 2006) was an English professional footballer. He represented his country on three occasions.

Garrett was a miner playing for Horden Colliery when Blackpool signed him as a 16-year-old in 1942, initially as a forward. It was as a full-back, however, that he established himself – and as a "footballing" defender, who preferred to pass his way out of trouble rather than kicking it downfield. He also spent hours practising heading the ball.

Garrett made his debut for the Seasiders on 29 March 1948, in a single-goal defeat at Derby County. He did not become a regular in the side until Ron Suart left for Blackburn Rovers in 1949.

The 1950s are the most successful decade in Blackpool's history to date. Garrett would be at the club playing top division football throughout, as would goalkeeper George Farm, fellow defender Hugh Kelly, right winger Stanley Matthews, forward Jackie Mudie and outside left Bill Perry.

He could perform equally well on either flank, and played in both the 1951 and 1953 FA Cup Finals, appearing in the latter with a broken nose sustained a week beforehand. It was during this period of his career that he gained his England caps, partnering Alf Ramsey. He made his international debut against Scotland on 5 April 1952.

After 14 years with Blackpool, Garrett joined Millwall on a free transfer in May 1961, making a dozen appearances for the Lions before retiring from the professional game and joining Fleetwood . He then played for a short time in Australia, with Mayfield United, and eventually settled there. He died on 16 April 2006 in Wallsend, New South Wales.

References

External links
The Football Association profile

Profile at EnglandFC.com

1926 births
2006 deaths
Association football defenders
Blackpool F.C. players
English Football League players
English Football League representative players
English footballers
England international footballers
Fleetwood Town F.C. players
Millwall F.C. players
Footballers from South Shields
Wigan Athletic F.C. players
FA Cup Final players